Mambasa is a town in the Ituri Province of the Democratic Republic of the Congo, the headquarters of  Mambasa Territory.

References

Populated places in Ituri Province